Jim McMasters (born September 20, 1952) is a Canadian former professional ice hockey forward.  He was drafted by the Buffalo Sabres of the National Hockey League in the third round, 37th overall, of the 1972 NHL Entry Draft; however, he never played in that league. He played 83 regular-season games and nine playoff games in the World Hockey Association with the Cleveland Crusaders in the 1972–73 and 1973–74 seasons. McMasters was born in High River, Alberta, but grew up in Nanton, Alberta.

Career statistics

External links

1952 births
Buffalo Sabres draft picks
Calgary Centennials players
Canadian ice hockey forwards
Cleveland Crusaders players
Ice hockey people from Alberta
Jacksonville Barons players
Living people
Macon Whoopees (SHL) players
Modo Hockey players
Omaha Knights (CHL) players
People from High River
Canadian expatriate ice hockey players in Sweden